Mount Overlook is a mostly snow-covered mountain rising to about 2,010 m and overlooking the middle portion of Sledgers Glacier from the north, in the Bowers Mountains of Antarctica. The feature was so named by M.G. Laird, leader of a New Zealand Antarctic Research Program (NZARP) geological party to the area, 1981–82, because the party obtained an excellent view from the summit.

Mountains of Victoria Land
Pennell Coast